Michel Blaton (born 23 April 1967) is a Belgian former equestrian. He competed in two events at the 1996 Summer Olympics.

References

External links
 

1967 births
Living people
Belgian male equestrians
Olympic equestrians of Belgium
Equestrians at the 1996 Summer Olympics
People from Ixelles
Sportspeople from Brussels